Zenne Dancer is a 2012 Turkish drama film directed by Caner Alper and Mehmet Binay.

The film is based upon an honor killing of a student, Ahmet Yıldız, by his family after realizing he was homosexual. The film describes the discrimation that LGBT people in Turkey have to deal with.

Awards
 Best First Film, Antalya Golden Orange Film Festival (2012)
 Best Film by Siyad (Cinema Critics), Antalya Golden Orange Film Festival (2012)
 Best Supporting Actor - Erkan Avcı, Antalya Golden Orange Film Festival (2012)
 Best Supporting Actress - Tilbe Saran, Antalya Golden Orange Film Festival (2012)
 Best Cinematography, Antalya Golden Orange Film Festival (2012)
 Vienna LetsCee Film Festival Best Feature Award
2012
San Diego Filmout Film Festival Best Foreign Feature Award
San Diego Filmout Film Festival Best Cinematography
San Diego Filmout Film Festival Best Soundtrack
San Diego Filmout Film Festival Best Supporting Actor
San Diego Filmout Film Festival Freedom Award (M.Binay – C.Alper)
2012  Los Angeles International AFFMA Film Festival  - Best Director Award
2012  Montreal World Film Festival Official Selection 
2012  SIYAD Turkish Cinema Critics Best Soundtrack of the Year Award
2012  Monaco Charity Film Festival Honorary Mention
2012  Nuremberg Turkish Film Festival Öngören Prize Human Rights Best Feature Award
2012  Amsterdam Rosetagen Film Festival Audience Best Feature Award
2012  GQ Men Of The Year - Best Director Award - Caner Alper & Mehmet Binay
2013  Bilkent University Cinema Festival - Best Film -   
Bilkent University Cinema Festival Best Director -   
Bilkent University Cinema Festival Best Screenplay -  
Bilkent University Cinema Festival Best Music - 
Bilkent University Cinema Festival Best Cinematography

Cast 
 Kerem Can - Can
 Giovanni Arvaneh - Daniel Bert
 Erkan Avcı - Ahmet
 Tilbe Saran - Sevgi
 Rüçhan Çalışkur - Kezban

Choreography
Eserzâde

References

External links 

2012 drama films
2012 films
Turkish LGBT-related films
Films about honor killing
2012 LGBT-related films
LGBT-related drama films